Dmytro Matsyuk or Dmitri Matsjuk (born 4 October 1981) is a Ukrainian-born ice dancer who competes for Austria. With Barbora Silna and Kira Geil, he became a five-time Austrian national champion and qualified to the free dance at six ISU Championships.

Career 
Matsyuk began learning to skate in 1985. Early in his career, he competed with Ekaterina Madej and Barbara Herzog.

In 2005, he teamed up with Czech-born skater Barbora Silná to compete on the senior level for Austria. The two won four Austrian national titles from 2006 to 2009 and the silver medal at the 2007 Ondrej Nepela Memorial. They qualified to the free dance at four ISU Championships – 2007 Europeans in Warsaw, Poland; 2008 Europeans in Zagreb, Croatia; 2008 Worlds in Gothenburg, Sweden; and 2009 Europeans in Helsinki, Finland. Their best result, 15th, came in Helsinki. They trained under Jana Hübler at Cottage Engelmann Club in Vienna and in Lyon.

Matsyuk competed with Kira Geil from 2009 to 2010. In December 2016, he competed at the Austrian Championships with Regina Yankovska. Today, he coaches ice skating, figure skating, and ice dancing to all ages in Vienna, Austria.

Programs

With Geil

With Silná

Competitive highlights 
GP: Grand Prix

With Geil

With Silná

References

External links

Navigation

Ukrainian male ice dancers
Austrian male ice dancers
1981 births
Living people
Sportspeople from Odesa